Zbyszewski is a surname. Notable people with the surname include:

Matt Zbyszewski (born 1981), Canadian volleyball player and coach
Paul Zbyszewski (born 1970), American television writer and producer
 (1818–1896), politician